The Kurshab, in its upper course Gulcha or Gülchö, is a river in southwestern Kyrgyzstan. It discharges into Andijan Reservoir, which is drained by the Kara Darya. The river is formed at the north slope of the Alay Mountains. The river is fed by mixed sources of snow (23%) and ice (11%) meltwater, and springs(66%). The river is used for irrigation. Several settlements are located near the river Kurshab, including Gülchö and Kurshab.

References 

Rivers of Kyrgyzstan